The We Are Pirates Tour is a concert tour by American rock band Blink-182 in support of the group's seventh studio album, California (2016). It consisted of festival and amphitheater dates and ran between May 14 and July 10, 2016 in North America. Support acts included All Time Low, Hawthorne Heights, Simple Plan, and the Used on select dates. Aside from the few club shows and the Musink Festival in 2015, the We Are Pirates tour was their first with guitarist and vocalist Matt Skiba and their first without founding member Tom DeLonge.

Background

After touring and releasing the band's sixth album Neighborhoods (2011), it became difficult for Blink-182 to record new material, due to guitarist Tom DeLonge's various projects. After disagreements, the remaining members of the group—vocalist/bassist Mark Hoppus and drummer Travis Barker—sought separation from DeLonge and recruited guitarist Matt Skiba, best known as the frontman of rock band Alkaline Trio, in his place. Blink-182 performed two club shows and a slot at the Musink Tattoo Convention & Music Festival in March 2015 with Skiba "filling in" for DeLonge. Afterwards, they regrouped and recorded the album California with producer John Feldmann.

Prior to the main headlining tour for California, the group embarked on the We Are Pirates Tour. They performed at several festivals, including X Games Austin 2016, Firefly Music Festival, Big Field Day, Amnesia Rockfest, and Kerfuffle 2016. Hoppus and Skiba also performed several acoustic sets in England in June 2016, including for BBC Radio 1's Rock All Dayer and Radio X. They also added four dates in Canada in early July, supported by Simple Plan and the Used.

Set list 
This setlist is representative of the June 4, 2016 performance in Austin. It is not representative of all concerts for the duration of the tour.

 "Feeling This"
 "What's My Age Again?"
 "Family Reunion"
 "The Rock Show"
 "First Date"
 "Down"
 "I Miss You"
 "Up All Night"
 "Bored to Death"
 "Built This Pool"
 "Dumpweed"
 "Always"
 "Stay Together for the Kids"
 "Man Overboard"
 "Violence"
 "Josie"
 "Happy Holidays, You Bastard"
 "Not Now"
 "Reckless Abandon"
 "Carousel"
Encore
 "All the Small Things"
 "Brohemian Rhapsody"
 "Dammit"

Shows

Personnel 
Mark Hoppus – vocals, bass guitar
Travis Barker – drums
Matt Skiba – vocals, guitar

References

Notes

Citations

External links
 

2016 concert tours
Blink-182 concert tours